Pascal Gabriel Dozie  (born 9 April 1939 in Owerri, Imo State) is a Nigerian entrepreneur and businessman. He is the founder of Diamond Bank and the chairman of Pan-Atlantic University.

Early life and education 
Dozie was born in 1939 in the Egbu village of Owerri, Nigeria. He was born into the family of Charles Dozie who was a Catholic catechist. Dozie attended Our Lady's School Emekuku where he obtained his First School Leaving Certificate (FSLC). He subsequently attended Holy Ghost Juniorate Seminary and Holy Ghost College, Owerri, where he obtained his West African Senior School Certificate Examination. After obtaining his high school certificate, he travelled to London where he studied economics at the London School of Economics and obtained a BSc in Economics. Subsequently, he attended City University in London where he studied operational research and industrial engineering and obtained a master's degree in Administrative Science.

Career 
Pascal Dozie began his career as an economist at the National Economic Development Office in the United Kingdom. He was also a part-time lecturer at the North Western Polytechnic, London. Between 1970 and 1971 he served as a consulting economist at the African States Consulting Organisation in Uganda. In 1971 after he left his job in Uganda, he relocated to Nigeria at the request of his mother. In 1971 after his return to Nigeria, with his experience in Econometrics and Industrial Engineering he launched his first company, the African Development Consulting Group (ADCG). ADCG had worked with companies such as Nestle and Pfizer. He was subsequently hired by Clement Isong, then Governor of the Central Bank of Nigeria, to conduct some studies on the Co-operative and Commerce Bank.

In 1985, he was appointed Chairman of Progress Bank, which is now defunct. Later that same year Dozie applied for a banking licence in order to help traders in South-Eastern Nigeria who were faced with banking problems. This brought about the birth of Diamond Bank. At its inception the share capital of the bank was ₦10million ($28,000) with only 21 interested shareholders. In 1990, he satisfied the requirements of the Central Bank of Nigeria to operate a standard bank and in 1991 the Diamond Bank began operations. He was CEO of Diamond Bank from 1991 to 2006 when he handed over to his son Uzoma Dozie.

Dozie was also at one time President of the Nigerian Stock Exchange. He currently owns shares in MTN Group and was Chairman of the company. He later resigned as the chairman and was succeeded by the former NCC boss Ernest Ndukwe.

Personal life 
Pascal is married to Chinyere Dozie and they have five children.

Awards 

 National Award of the order of the Niger (OON)
 Commander of the Order of the Niger (CON) 
 AABLA (All Africa Business Leader Award)-Lifetime Achievement Award winner

References 

Living people
1939 births
People from Owerri
20th-century Nigerian businesspeople
Nigerian company founders
Financial company founders
Nigerian financial businesspeople
Nigerian business executives